Submarine Squadron 14 (SUBRON 14), was a United States Navy submarine squadron.

History
During World War II,  served as tender and staff headquarters for Submarine Squadron 14's staff and Division Staff in Pearl Harbor from July to September 1943.

Postwar it consisted of Polaris and later Poseidon Fleet Ballistic Missile (FBM) submarines based at Holy Loch, Scotland.  Commissioned 1 July 1958, the Squadron arrived at FBM Refit Site 1, Holy Loch on 3 March 1961 and departed in June 1992.

The squadron was part of Submarine Force, U.S. Atlantic Fleet. The squadron also included a series of submarine tenders anchored out in the Loch, initially , tugs, barges, small boats, and the floating drydock .

The site was a deep, sheltered anchorage which had been a British submarine base during the Second World War with the Submarine Depot Ship  serving as a support unit for submarines training in the Clyde.

From the latter half of 1978 until November 1991  was forward deployed at Site One in Holy Loch. On 9 November 1991, Will Rogers departed Site One, the last submarine to leave Holy Loch before Submarine Squadron 14 was deactivated.

FBM submarine tenders assigned to SUBRON 14
—(March 1961 – March 1963)
—(March 1963 – July 1966) (January 1982 – June 1987)
—(July 1966 – May 1970) (June 1987 – June 1992)
—(May 1970 – November 1975)
—(November 1975 – January 1982)

Tugs assigned to SUBRON 14

Service craft assigned to SUBRON 14
 (Dry Dock)
YFNB-31—Living/Working Barge: Boat Operations Department
YFNB-42—Living/Working Barge: Tech Rep Offices and Submarine Crew Temporary Berthing
YD-245—Floating barge Crane

Small boats
There was also a large number of small boats used to transport personnel and supplies from the shore to the ship. Among these small boats were  Utility Boats, LCM Mk6 and Mk8 landing craft, some with the holds roofed over for personnel transport, and a  officers motorboat. The ships' divers had a LCM Mk6 modified as a dive boat. There was also a boat known as the "Box L" of uncertain heritage.

Polaris military tartan

The idea for the Polaris Military Tartan came from Captain Walter F Schlech while he was Commodore of SUBRON 14 in the early 1960s.  The design of the tartan was done by Alexander MacIntyre of Strone.  The tartan is the same as the Black Watch tartan with the addition of a yellow - black - sky blue - black - yellow overcheck of four threads each. The yellow and sky blue lines are said to represent the alternating blue and gold crews of the FBM submarines.  The tartan is worn by the members of the United States Naval Academy Pipes and Drums.

References

Submarine squadrons of the United States Navy
Military units and formations established in 1958
1958 establishments in the United States